Koch-e Yusof (also Romanized as Koch-e Yūsof; also known as Koch) is a village in Negur Rural District, Dashtiari District, Chabahar County, Sistan and Baluchestan Province, Iran. At the 2006 census, its population was 645, in 120 families.

References 

Populated places in Chabahar County